Hardoi is a city and municipal board in Hardoi district in the Indian state of Uttar Pradesh. It is the administrative headquarters of Hardoi district.

History

The early history of Hardoi is obscure. The name suggests a Bhar, a Dalit caste of pasi origin, but tradition either attributes it to a Thathera ruler named Raja Harnakas or to a religious devotee named Hardeo Babar who supposedly lived here around 1000 CE. In any case, the site was inhabited from an early date; below the old town is an ancient khera that covers 16 acres. Around 1300, a group of Chamar Gaurs led by one Sale Singh are said to have conquered the place from the Thatheras, destroyed their fortress, and re-founded the city.

At the turn of the 20th century, Hardoi consisted of two distinct parts: "old" Hardoi, occupying the original site of the village, and "new" Hardoi, which was developed after the establishment of the British civil station in the late 1850s. "New" Hardoi had wide streets, well-shaded by trees, and consisted mostly of the homes of civil officials and members of the local bar, as well as shops. Victoria Hall, built in 1888, contained the municipal and district offices as well as a public library (with books in English, Urdu, Hindi, Persian, Arabic, and Sanskrit) and a clock tower. The city also had a courthouse, police station, dispensary, orphanage, several schools, post and telegraph offices, and jail. Hardoi was not at the time a major commercial centre; the main trade involved gathering grain from the rural parts of the district and then exporting it by rail. There was a grain market at Railwayganj, by the train station, while the main market was at Hardeoganj, which held bazaars on Sundays and Wednesdays. The Gibsonganj quarter, near Railwayganj, had a colony of carpenters who did "extensive business in plough handles, cart wheels, and other portions of country carts."

Geography
Hardoi is located 110 km from Lucknow (capital of Uttar Pradesh) and 394 from New Delhi (capital of India).
The Ganges and several of its tributaries are crossing the south of Hardoi district. Its area is 5947 square kilometres. The record height is 500  ft. In 1995, Hardoi district had 5 square kilometres of dense forest and 13 square kilometres of open forest.
The length of this district from northwest to southeast is 125.529  km and width from east to west are 74.83  km.
District Hardoi comprises five tehsils (Hardoi, Shahabad, Bilgram, Sandila, and Sawayajpur), 19 blocks, 191 Nyay Panchayat, 1101 Gram Sabha, and 1901 inhabited revenue villages. Sandi Bird Sanctuary created in 1990, previously, "Dahar Jheel", is an important ecotourism bird habitat.
Gomati river flows mainly in Hardoi.

It also has 7 Nagar Palika Parishads & 6 Nagar Panchayats . Geographical area is 5947 km2.  

Climate

Demographics

As of 2011 Indian Census, Hardoi had a total population of 126,851, of which 66,352 were males and 60,499 were females. Population within the age group of 0 to 6 years was 14,048. Hardoi had an average literary rate of 76%, of which male literacy was 79.5% and female literacy was 72.1%. The Scheduled Castes and Scheduled Tribes population was 12,277 and 4 respectively. Hardoi had 21949 households in 2011.

Economy
As of 1971, the economy of Hardoi was described as a hybrid between the service, commercial, and industrial sectors. The main items imported were kerosene oil, cane sugar, and cloth. The main items manufactured were sugar, groundnut oil, and lime. The biggest exports were sugar, groundnut oil, and arhar.

Education
Jawahar Navodaya Vidyalaya Pihani Hardoi 
Kendriya Vidyalaya, Hardoi
Seth M.R. Jaipuria School, Hardoi
Shri Guru Ram Rai Public School
St.James School, Hardoi

References

External links

 
Cities in Uttar Pradesh